The 2021–22 Handball Championship of Bosnia and Herzegovina was the 21st season of this championship, with teams from Bosnia and Herzegovina participating in it. Izviđač were the men's defending champions, and Borac were the women's defending champions.

Borac won the men's title, Grude won the women's title.

Premier handball league for men

Competition format 
Sixteen teams joined the regular season, played as double round robin tournament.

2021-22 Season participants 

The following 16 clubs compete in the Handball Premier League during the 2021–22 season.

Premier handball league for women

Competition format 
Twelve teams joined the regular season, played as double round robin tournament.

2021-22 Season participants 
The following 12 clubs compete in the Handball Premier League during the 2021–22 season.

References 

Handball Championship of Bosnia and Herzegovina
2021–22 domestic handball leagues